Michael John Bradley (born July 17, 1966) is an American professional golfer.

Bradley was born in Largo, Florida. He attended Oklahoma State University and turned professional in 1988.

After turning professional, Bradley joined the Canadian Tour. He won the 1989 Ontario Open and the 1990 Quebec Open. He also shot a 59 in an event in Saskatoon, Saskatchewan.

Bradley earned his PGA Tour card through qualifying school in 1992 and played full-time from 1993 to 2000. He won the 1996 Buick Challenge and the 1998 Doral-Ryder Open. 1996 was his best year on the PGA Tour, where he finished in 20th on the money list while recording a win and a runner-up finish. In 1995, he had a notable PGA Championship, becoming one of the few players ever to shoot 63 in the first round of a major; however, Bradley's hot streak then tailed off and he was not among the championship's leaders by Sunday. He then split his playing time between the PGA Tour and the Nationwide Tour. In 2009, he won his third PGA Tour event at the Puerto Rico Open. This gave him a two-year exemption on the PGA Tour, an exemption he extended when he repeated his win at the same event in 2011. After 2013, Bradley could not produce favorable results and played a limited PGA Tour schedule out of the Past Champions category until he joined PGA Tour Champions after turning 50.

Professional wins (6)

PGA Tour wins (4)

*Note: The 1996 Buick Challenge was shortened to 36 holes due to inclement weather.

PGA Tour playoff record (2–0)

Canadian Tour wins (2)
1989 Ontario Open
1990 Quebec Open

Results in major championships

CUT = missed the half-way cut
"T" = tied

Results in The Players Championship

CUT = missed the halfway cut
"T" indicates a tie for a place

Results in World Golf Championships

QF, R16, R32, R64 = Round in which player lost in match play

See also
1992 PGA Tour Qualifying School graduates
2006 PGA Tour Qualifying School graduates

References

External links

American male golfers
Oklahoma State Cowboys golfers
PGA Tour golfers
PGA Tour Champions golfers
Golfers from Florida
People from Largo, Florida
Sportspeople from Hillsborough County, Florida
People from Valrico, Florida
1966 births
Living people